Alberto Gurrola Castro (9 April 1993 – 25 June 2022) was a Mexican professional footballer and goalkeeper coach.

Playing career 
Gurrola started his career at Club Atlas Fuerzas Básicas, the Academy of CF Atlas and made his professional debut on loan with Lobos BUAP on 22 August 2013 during a 4–1 Copa MX loss to Veracruz. In summer 2014 he joined Cimarrones de Sonora, before retiring in summer 2015.

In 2013 Gurrola played for the Mexico U23 national team at the 2013 Toulon Tournament and in the same year, he was backup at the FIFA U-20 World Cup in Turkey, for the Mexico U20.

Coaching career 
After his playing career Gurrola worked as goalkeeper coach for the Mexico U17, Mexico U18, Mexico men's and Mexico women's national teams.

Personal life 
His younger brother José Gurrola and father José Carlos Gurrola were footballers.

Death 
Gurrola died on 25 June 2022, at the age of 29.

References

External links
 

1993 births
2022 deaths
Sportspeople from Hermosillo
Footballers from Sonora
Association football goalkeepers
Mexico youth international footballers
Lobos BUAP footballers
Cimarrones de Sonora players
Liga Premier de México players
Tercera División de México players
Mexican football managers
20th-century Mexican people
Mexican footballers